Carlos J. Bernhardt (born 1950) is a Dominican professional baseball scout long associated with the Baltimore Orioles of Major League Baseball.  He also served the Orioles as their Major League first base coach on the staff of manager Ray Miller during the  season.

Bernhardt, a native of San Pedro de Macorís, was briefly a pitcher in minor league baseball, appearing in 16 games in the Seattle Pilots (1969) and New York Yankees (1971) organizations.

He began scouting for the Orioles in 1985 and served as their chief scout in the Dominican Republic through 1997, resuming that assignment in 1999 after his year as a Major League coach.  He was listed as a scout in the Dominican for the Orioles through , his 28th year with the franchise.

References

External links

Coach's page from Retrosheet

1950 births
Date of birth missing (living people)
Living people
Baltimore Orioles coaches
Baltimore Orioles scouts
Fort Lauderdale Yankees players
Major League Baseball first base coaches
Newark Co-Pilots players
Sportspeople from San Pedro de Macorís
Dominican Republic people of Cocolo descent